Chelsea Theatre is a studio theatre located on the Kings Road in the Royal Borough of Kensington and Chelsea, London. It presents, commissions, and produces material and works with the local community.

References

External links
 Chelsea Theatre website
 Live Art Development Agency

Theatres in the Royal Borough of Kensington and Chelsea
Theatre companies in London
Studio theatres in London
Arts centres in London
Arts in London
Festivals in London
Entertainment in London